Jeff Ralph Wright (born June 13, 1949) is a former American football player. He played safety for the Minnesota Vikings for the National Football League (NFL) from 1971 to 1977, appearing in three Super Bowls.  He finished his NFL career with 12 interceptions and 9 fumbles recovered in 82 regular season games.   After graduating from Edina High School, Wright attended the University of Minnesota, where he was to the 1970 All-Big Ten Conference football team.  He was drafted by his hometown team in 15th round of the 1971 NFL Draft.

References

1949 births
Living people
American football safeties
Minnesota Vikings players
Minnesota Golden Gophers football players
People from Edina, Minnesota
Players of American football from Minnesota
Edina High School alumni